Cresponea ancistrosporelloides is a species of lichen in the family Roccellaceae. Known only from Stirling Range National Park in Western Australia, it was described as new to science in 2011. The specific epithet ancistrosporelloides  refers to the similarity of its tailed spores to those of genus Ancistrosporella.

References

Roccellaceae
Lichen species
Lichens described in 2011
Lichens of Australia
Taxa named by Harrie Sipman